Middlemore is a southern suburb of Auckland, New Zealand.

Middlemore may also refer to:

Middlemore Hospital, a hospital in Middlemore, New Zealand
Middlemores Saddles, horse saddles, bicycle saddles and accessories company formerly based in Birmingham, England

People
Amphilis Throckmorton Middlemore (1891-1931), daughter of Sir John Middlemore
George Middlemore (d. 1850), British Army officer and politician
Henry Middlemore (d. 1592), English courtier
Humphrey Middlemore (d. 1535), English Catholic priest and Carthusian hermit
John Middlemore Sir John Throgmorton Middlemore (1844-1924), baronet, MP. Brother of Thomas Middlemore 
Maria Trinidad Howard Sturgis Middlemore (1846-1890), author, sister-in-law of Thomas Middlemore, wife of SGC Middlemore
Mary Middlemore (d. 1618) English courtier
Samuel George Chetwynd Middlemore (1848-1890), English translator and journalist
Thomas Middlemore (1842–1923), English mountaineer and head of Middlemores Saddles